The Rivers State Ministry of Education is a ministry of the Government of Rivers State of Nigeria, created to encourage development of education in the state. The ministry is tasked with the formulation of policies for promoting and realizing effective educational standards, and practices similar to those of other jurisdictions. The ministry is headquartered at the 7th Floor of the State Secretariat Complex in Port Harcourt.

List of commissioners
Kaniye Ebeku (2015–)
Alice Lawrence Nemi (2009–15)
Ngozi Odu (2003–07)
Allwell Onyesoh (1999–03)
Celestine Omehia (1992–93)

Awards
Some of the awards won by the ministry include:
ANCOPSS Award
Time News Leadership Gold Award
Babs Fafunwa Education Prize

See also
Government of Rivers State
Rivers State Ministry of Health
Universal Basic Education Board

References

External links
Official website

 
Education
Rivers State
Ministry